Line Haddad is a World and Olympic pair skater and was the youngest athlete to compete at the Olympics at Albertville. She is also an international choreographer and a performer with the Ice theatre of Ny company. Former student of Oleg Vassiliev, she is two time French National Champion, one-time Israeli National Champion. As a dancer, she graduated from the Paris Conservatoire in ballet and has also trained and performed in modern dance and Argentine Tango (NY City Center, Google, NY Live Arts, and The Madison Theatre).

Professional career
She is known for her choreographies and work with various world and Olympic skaters, among them are:

Vanessa James / Morgan Cipres 
Lola Esbrat/ Andrei Novoselov 
Laurine Lecavalier 
Adeline Canac/Maximin Coia 
Marie-pierre Leray/Nicolas Osseland 
Yannick Bonheur
Taryn Jurgensen

She also coached skaters at ISU Grand Prix events (Skate America, Trophee de France).

After touring with Philippe Candeloro and the French team, she joined the Ice theatre of New York as a Performer and worked with choreographers such as David Parson, Doug Webster, and David Liu. She was also featured in Dance Visions on Ice on NBC starring Nancy Kerrigan and Evgeni Plushenko and well as in a TV show Glee Episode. Academically, she received her Master of Arts in translation and linguistics in Paris, majoring in French, English, and Spanish.

Her most recent choreographies includes Milongon performed at Rockefeller center with Ice dancer Brent Bommentre and composition by world renowned bandoneon player JP Jofre. Line Haddad contemporary piece 11h11 with 6 solo skaters and one couple was also featured at the ITNY home season honoring Evgeni Plushenko  and Tai Babilonia and Randy Gardner in Chelsea Piers in October 2017.

Results

With Privé for France

With Lycenko for Israel

References

External links
 linehaddad.com

1978 births
People from L'Union
Olympic figure skaters of France
Figure skaters at the 1992 Winter Olympics
French female pair skaters
Israeli female pair skaters
Living people
20th-century French Jews
Sportspeople from Haute-Garonne